is a passenger railway station located in the city of Machida, Tokyo, Japan, operated by the private railway operator Odakyu Electric Railway.

Lines

Station layout

The station has one side platform and one island platform, serving a total of three tracks, with the platforms connected by a footbridge.

Platforms

History
The station opened on 1 April 1927.

Station numbering was introduced in January 2014 with Tsurukawa being assigned station number OH25.

Passenger statistics
In fiscal 2019, the station was used by an average of 68,992 passengers daily.

Surrounding area

 Wako University
 Kokushikan University (Tsurukawa Campus)

References

External links

 Odakyu station information 

Odakyu Odawara Line
Railway stations in Tokyo
Railway stations in Japan opened in 1927
Stations of Odakyu Electric Railway
Machida, Tokyo